The coat of arms of Solomon Islands shows a shield which is framed by a crocodile and a shark. The motto is displayed under it, which reads "To Lead Is to Serve". Over the shield there is a helmet with decorations, crowned by a stylised sun.

Historical coat of arms

References 

Solomon
National symbols of the Solomon Islands
Solomon Islands
Solomon Islands
Solomon Islands
Solomon Islands
Solomon Islands
Solomon Islands
Solomon Islands
Solomon Islands
Solomon Islands